Emil Altobello (born July 8, 1949) is an American politician who served in the Connecticut House of Representatives from the 82nd district from 1995 to 2021.

References

1949 births
Living people
Politicians from Meriden, Connecticut
Democratic Party members of the Connecticut House of Representatives
21st-century American politicians